Douglas Robert Casey (born May 5, 1946 in Chicago, Illinois) is an American writer, speculator, and the founder and chairman of Casey Research. He describes himself as an anarcho-capitalist influenced by the works of novelist Ayn Rand.

Early life and education
Casey graduated from Georgetown University in 1968. He was raised Roman Catholic, but later became an atheist.

He is the son of Eugene B. Casey, a multimillionaire real estate developer.

Career
Casey's 1979 book Crisis Investing was number one on The New York Times Non-Fiction Best Seller list in 1980 for 29 consecutive weeks. It was the best-selling financial book of 1980 with 438,640 copies sold.

Casey has a wine and residential sporting estate project called Estancia de Cafayate in Salta Province, Argentina.

Casey has recommended investments in gold.

Casey Research
Casey Research publishes a financial newsletter from an Austrian School anarcho-capitalist perspective which advises on the purchase of microcap stocks, precious metals, and other investments.

Views and approach
Casey describes himself as a contrarian.  He applies this view to investment, economic interpretations, and government. He has said, "You've got to be a speculator today. It's no longer possible to work hard and save your money and get ahead in life."

Casey has been critical of an interventionist foreign policy.

Books
 Strategic Investing (1982). Paperback: 
 The International Man (1976). Hardcover: 
 Crisis Investing : Opportunities and profits in the coming great depression. (1979). Hardcover: . Paperback: .
 Crisis Investing for the Rest of the 90s (1993). Paperback: .
 Totally Incorrect: Conversations with Doug Casey (2012). Paperback: .
 Right on the Money (2013). Paperback: . John Wiley & Sons
 Speculator (with John Hunt) (2016). Paperback: . High Ground Novels
 Drug Lord (with John Hunt) (2017). Paperback: . High Ground Novels
 Assassin (with John Hunt) (2020). Paperback: . High Ground Novels

References

External links
  Official Website
 
 YouTube Channel: Doug Casey's Take

1946 births
Living people
20th-century American economists
20th-century American male writers
21st-century American economists
21st-century American male writers
21st-century American novelists
American anarcho-capitalists
American atheists
American expatriates in Argentina
American finance and investment writers
American former Christians
American investors
American libertarians
American male non-fiction writers
American male novelists
American political writers
Austrian School economists
Economists from Illinois
Economists from Vermont
Georgetown University alumni
Non-interventionism
People from Lamoille County, Vermont
Writers from Chicago